Prosansanosmilus is an extinct genus of mammalian carnivores of the suborder Feliformia, family Barbourofelidae, which lived in Europe during the Miocene epoch (16.9—16.0 mya), existing for approximately . It contains Prosansanosmilus peregrinus, which died out in the Miocene epoch.

Taxonomy
Prosansanosmilus was named by Heizmann et al. (1980). Its type is Prosansanosmilus peregrinus. It was assigned to Nimravinae by Heizmann et al. (1980); to Felidae by Carroll (1988); to Barbourofelinae by Bryant (1991); and to Barbourofelidae by Morlo et al. (2004) and Morlo (2006).

A new species, P. eggeri from the Middle Eocene locality of Sandelzhausen, Germany, was described in 2004. It differed from other European barbourofelids in having a more plesiomorphic ("ancestral") morphology, with less developed sabretooth adaptations and being smaller. However, the species is stratigraphically younger than P. peregrinus; and probably part of the African faunal immigration into Europe during the Middle Eocene.

Wyss and Flynn classified Prosansanosmilus peregrinus in the superorder Carnivoramorpha in 1993. Some scientists also think that Prosansanosmilus peregrinus was in the family Nimravidae. However, this was proved wrong. Linnaeus classified Prosansanosmilus Peregrinus in the clade Ferae. Many scientists also agree that Prosansanosmilus peregrinus belonged to the Infraorder Feloidea. As a result, Prosansanosmilus peregrinus was closely related to the family Felidae and the family Nimravidae.

Distribution
P. peregrinus lived in MN4 of France and Germany. Two fossils of P. peregrinus have been found in France and another two have been found in Germany. P. peregrinus was a ground-dwelling creature.

Morphology
Like all barbourofelids, Prosansanosmilus was very muscular, short legged and probably walked plantigrade (flat-footed). There are only two species of Prosansanosmilus, which lived in Spain, France and Germany during the Late Miocene epoch.

Diet
P. peregrinus was either a carnivore or an omnivore.

Time range
P. peregrinus is thought to have lived between 16.9 and 16 Mya. New evidence suggests that P. peregrinus lived 20–16 Mya. German scientists excavated a fossil of P. peregrinus dating 20 Mya. Other scientists think that P.Peregrinus lived between 16.9 and 15.7 Mya.

References

Barbourofelidae
Prehistoric mammals of Europe
Miocene carnivorans
Prehistoric carnivoran genera